Andrea Nicole Guck Eigenmann (born 25 June 1990), professionally known as Andi Eigenmann, is a Filipino former actress, model, and social media influencer.

Early life

Descent and family
Eigenmann is the daughter of actors Mark Gil and Jaclyn Jose, and is a half-sister of actors Sid Lucero, Gabby Eigenmann and Max Eigenmann from Mark Gil's side. Her aunt from her mother's side is actress Veronica Jones. She has German-American ancestry from her mother, and Swiss and Spanish ancestry from her father.

Education
She graduated elementary in 2004 and high school in 2008 at the basic education department of Miriam College in Katipunan, Quezon City. After finishing high school, she studied Bachelor of Arts in Fashion Design and Merchandising at De La Salle-College of Saint Benilde in Taft Avenue, Malate, Manila.

Career
In 2007, Eigenmann started her showbiz career in a soap opera Prinsesa ng Banyera on ABS-CBN, where she played the role of Sandy. In 2008, she appeared in the reality show Pinoy Big Brother: Teen Edition Plus. She was the second house player to enter the house and was evicted on day 53. In 2009, she was one of the 12 finalists of the MYX VJ Search 2009. In 2010, she played the lead and title role in the fantasy drama series, Agua Bendita, in which she played a dual role; Agua and Bendita, twin sisters.

Eigenmann went on to play various characters in eight episodes of the long-running musical anthology series, Your Song. In addition, she appeared in two Regal Films in 2010: Mamarazzi and Shake, Rattle and Roll XII. Eigenmann co-starred as Gabrielle "Gabby" Marcelo in the 2011 critically acclaimed family military drama series "Minsan Lang Kita Iibigin", together with Maja Salvador and Coco Martin.

After giving birth, Eigenmann returned to acting via Kahit Puso'y Masugatan in 2012, along with Gabby Concepcion, Jake Cuenca and Iza Calzado. In the same year, she also starred in a horror film Pridyider with Janice de Belen and JM de Guzman under Regal Films, and in a romantic drama film A Secret Affair with Derek Ramsay and Anne Curtis produced by Viva Films. Before A Secret Affair, Eigenmann signed a contract with Viva Artists Agency, a talent management of Viva Entertainment, where her mother Jaclyn Jose came from. In 2013, she top-billed the daytime fantasy horror drama series Galema: Anak ni Zuma, and later appeared in the 2014 fantasy drama series Dyesebel.

In 2015, she starred in a lead role in Maalaala Mo Kaya with first time leading man Jake Cuenca.

In October 2017, Eigenmann revealed that she was quitting the "artista life," but she later clarified it is the lifestyle of showbiz that she is not quitting acting altogether. However, in 2018 she starred in The Maid in London, her last film before she left the limelight for good.

Personal life
On 23 November 2011, Eigenmann gave birth to a daughter named Adrianna Gabrielle "Ellie" Eigenmann via Caesarean section. When asked about the identity of her child's father, Eigenmann claimed that actor Jake Ejercito, son of former Philippine President Joseph Estrada, is the father of her daughter Ellie, saying that "he was there since the beginning and he loves my daughter like his own, and so he's the father." Eigenmann said that she never took a DNA paternity test for her child. Eigenmann and Ejercito split in 2014.

In 2018, Eigenmann entered into a relationship with professional surfer Philmar Alipayo. On 23 July 2019, she gave birth to her second child and first with Alipayo, a daughter named Keliana Alohi "Lilo" Eigenmann Alipayo. In August 2020, Eigenmann announced she was pregnant with her third child and second with Alipayo. The couple announced in a video on their YouTube channel released December 13, 2020 that the child is a boy. Eigenmann and Alipayo then announced via Instagram on December 20 that they were engaged. On January 17, 2021, Andi gave birth to her third child, a boy named Koa, announcing it on her Instagram account on January 19. The family is based in Siargao., Surigao del Norte in the Philippines.

Filmography

Film

Television

Awards and nominations

References

External links

1990 births
Living people
People from Marikina
De La Salle–College of Saint Benilde alumni
Actresses from Metro Manila
Filipino child actresses
Filipino film actresses
Filipino television actresses
VJs (media personalities)
Filipino female models
Filipino people of German descent
Filipino people of Irish descent
Filipino people of Scottish descent
Filipino people of Spanish descent
Filipino people of Swiss descent
Star Magic
Viva Artists Agency
Andi
ABS-CBN personalities